The 1993 Paris Open was a men's tennis tournament played on indoor carpet courts. It was the 21st edition of the Paris Masters, and was part of the ATP Championship Series, Single-Week of the 1993 ATP Tour. It took place at the Palais omnisports de Paris-Bercy in Paris, France, from 1 November through 8 November 1993. Ninth-seeded Goran Ivanišević won the singles title.

The draw was headlined by world No. 1 Pete Sampras, Jim Courier, and Boris Becker. Other top seeds were Michael Stich, Sergi Bruguera, Stefan Edberg, Michael Chang, and Goran Ivanišević.

Finals

Singles

 Goran Ivanišević defeated  Andriy Medvedev, 6–4, 6–2, 7–6(7–2)
It was Goran Ivanišević's 3rd title of the year and 9th of his career. It was his 1st Masters title of the year, and his 2nd overall.

Doubles

 Byron Black /  Jonathan Stark defeated  Tom Nijssen /  Cyril Suk, 4–6, 7–5, 6–2

References

External links
 ATP tournament profile
 Official website